Canadian-Egyptian relations are foreign relations between Canada and Egypt.  Both countries established embassies in their respective capitals in 1954.  Canada has an embassy in Cairo.  Egypt has an embassy in Ottawa and a Consulate-General in Montreal. Though both had been part of the British Empire, only Canada is part of the Commonwealth, Egypt is not.

History
Canada and Egypt first established diplomatic ties in 1954 after the Egyptian Revolution of 1952 and the abdication of the Egyptian monarchy, thus creating the Republic of Egypt under President Jamal Abdel Nasser. They both established embassies in their respective capitals, a Canadian one in Cairo and with the Egyptian Embassy located in Ottawa. The two countries enjoyed good relations, but did not take prominence to one another until Canada intervened in The Suez Crisis of 1956 when Nasser nationalized the Suez Canal and in response France, The United Kingdom and Israel took military actions against Egypt.

Canada decried the actions taken by France, the UK and Israel against Egypt and after the end of hostilities the Canadian Minister of External Affairs Lester B. Pearson proposed that the United Nations create a United Nations Emergency Force (UNEF), whose mission was to enter Egyptian territory and act as a buffer between Egyptian forces and Israeli forces in occupied territory. Canada pledged a substantial number of troops to the UNEF mission. On May 16, 1967 Egypt ordered all UNEF forces out of Egyptian territory, and most had retreated before the beginning of the Six-Day War.

2010–2012
Canada provided aid to Egypt. Official development assistance (ODA) from Canada to Egypt is estimated 17m US dollars in 2010-2011. Aid has been targeted at micro-finance, helping private sector growth in small enterprises, funding for apprenticeships, training, and literacy.

2013 Coup
The Canadian government was amongst those to use the word "coup" to describe the ouster of President Mohamed Morsi by the Egyptian military. In the weeks following the coup, however, the Canadian government did not further question the legitimacy of the new regime and instead issued generic calls for peace and dialog and took a "wait and see" approach.

See also 

 Foreign relations of Canada
 Foreign relations of Egypt

References

External links 
 Canada-Egypt Relations - Government of Canada
  Canadian embassy in Cairo - Government of Canada
 Embassy of Canada to Egypt  Verified Government Page on FB